Žim is a municipality and village in Teplice District in the Ústí nad Labem Region of the Czech Republic. It has about 200 inhabitants.

Administrative parts
The village of Záhoří is an administrative part of Žim.

References

Villages in Teplice District